UCSI University is a private university in Malaysia. 

It's ranked 284th university in the world. Currently, all UCSI University's programmes have received a 100% employability score from the Malaysian Higher Education Ministry's Graduate Employability 2021 survey, making its graduates highly employable in the job market.

UCSI University academic programs at the undergraduate and postgraduate levels. These include programs in business, engineering, architecture, medicine, pharmacy, nursing, applied science, music, and social science.

UCSI University is accredited by the Malaysian Qualifications Agency (MQA), the Malaysian Medical Council (MMC), the Malaysian Nursing Board (MNB), and several other professional bodies.

History 
UCSI was founded in 1986 by Dato' Peter Ng as a computer-training institute in Petaling Jaya. It soon relocated to new premises in Kuala Lumpur to cater to growing student numbers and more academic programmes were offered. UCSI was accorded college status in 1990 by the Ministry of Education (Malaysia), university college status in 2003 and full-fledged university status in 2008, becoming Malaysia's second private university. The institution was formerly known as Sedaya.

There is UCSI College, which is sister institution.

Faculties and institutes
UCSI University has seven faculties and three institutes that offer more than 100 academic programmes.

 Faculty of Applied Sciences
 Faculty of Business and Management
 Faculty of Engineering, Technology and Built Environment
 Faculty of Hospitality and Tourism Management
 Faculty of Medicine and Health Sciences
 Faculty of Pharmaceutical Sciences
 Faculty of Social Science and Liberal Arts
 Institute of Actuarial Science and Data Analytics
 Institute of Music
 Institute of Computer Science and Digital Innovation
 De Institute of Creative Arts and Design

References 

Universities and colleges in Kuala Lumpur
Business schools in Malaysia
Music schools in Malaysia
Educational institutions established in 1986
1986 establishments in Malaysia
Private universities and colleges in Malaysia